"" is the 15th single by Zard and released 5 June 1995 under B-Gram Records label. The single debuted at #2 rank first week. It charted for 11 weeks and sold over 721,000 copies.

Track list
All songs are written by Izumi Sakai.

composer: Masazumi Ozawa (Pamelah)/arrangement: Takeshi Hayama
Teenage Dream
composer: Seiichiro Kuribayashi/arrangement: Masao Akashi
Deen's Teenage dream self-cover
 (original karaoke)
Teenage dream (original karaoke) 
coupling's karaoke songs came back again after two singles

References

1995 singles
Zard songs
Songs written by Izumi Sakai
1995 songs